The 1907 Marquette Blue and Gold football team was an American football team that represented Marquette University as an independent during the 1907 college football season. In its first and only season under head coach Cody Clark, the team compiled a 6–0 record.

Schedule

References

Marquette
Marquette Golden Avalanche football seasons
College football undefeated seasons
Marquette Blue and Gold football